Storuman Municipality is a municipality in Västerbotten County in northern Sweden. Its seat is located in Storuman.

The parish Stensele was created as late as 1822. It was, together with the parish Tärna, made into a municipality in 1863. In 1903 Tärna was detached to form a municipality of its own. The local government reform of 1971 saw the reunification of Stensele and Tärnaby municipalities, thus forming Storuman Municipality with the name taken from its largest town.

Tärnaby, a small village in the municipality, has fostered the internationally famous alpine skiers Ingemar Stenmark, Stig Strand and Anja Pärson.

Geography

Localities
There are four localities (or urban areas) in Storuman Municipality:

The municipal seat in bold

Transportation
Storuman Municipality has two major roads, E12 and E45, crossing in Storuman. An international tourist route Blue Highway (Norway - Sweden - Finland - Russia) goes through Storuman.

There are two railways, Inlandsbanan and the Storuman-Hällnäs Line in Storuman. The former is used for tourist trains in the summer, and both for freight trains.

The nearest airport for the eastern part of Storuman Municipality is Vilhelmina Airport. For the western part, Hemavan Airport is situated near the village centre of Hemavan.

Sister cities
The following cities are twinned with Storuman:
  Viitasaari, Central Finland

References

External links

Storuman Municipality - Official site 

Municipalities of Västerbotten County